This is a list of ambassadors of the United States to the Dominican Republic.

List of ambassadors

See also
Dominican Republic – United States relations
Foreign relations of the Dominican Republic
Ambassadors of the United States

References

Sources
United States Department of State: Background notes on the Dominican Republic

External links
 United States Department of State: Chiefs of Mission for the Dominican Republic
 United States Department of State: Dominican Republic
 United States Embassy in Santo Domingo

 
United States
Dominican Republic
Dominican Republic